Curtis Scott Jacobs, (Scott Jacobs), is an American argumentation, communication, and rhetorical scholar.

He graduated from the University of Illinois with a PhD. He taught for many years at the University of Arizona. He is now professor of Communication at the University of Illinois. He has lectured in France, Belgium, Germany, Italy, and the Netherlands. He has contributed to the field of argumentation theory.

His work appeared in Communication Monographs, Communication Theory, Journal of the American Forensic Association, Quarterly Journal of Speech, and Argumentation.

Works 
  (appeared in The Quarterly Journal of Speech. LXVI, 251–265.)

References

Communication theorists
University of Illinois Urbana-Champaign alumni
University of Arizona faculty
University of Illinois Urbana-Champaign faculty
Living people
Year of birth missing (living people)